Arrows Fitz (born Arielle Scott; 1989), commonly known as Ari Fitz, is a model, vlogger, television personality, and film producer. He is best known for his YouTube channel Tomboyish, in which he explores topics related to being an androgynous person who presents as both masculine and feminine.

Life and career 

Fitz was born in Vallejo, California. He attended University of California, Berkeley and received a degree in business, and began to model as an undergraduate. He has modeled for companies such as UGG and Kenzo, and appeared on a cover for Nylon.

Fitz created his YouTube channel when he was 23, and soon after appeared as a cast member on Real World: Ex-Plosion, at the time going by the name Arielle Scott. In 2016, Fitz moved to Los Angeles to pursue a full-time career in vlogging. Soon after arriving, he turned down a modeling contract at a well-known agency because the agency sought to control his YouTube content. Fitz began to vlog daily on his YouTube channel Tomboyish. The majority of the content is related to gender and sexuality. Fitz also produces short films that he posts to his channel, such as Bubbles, a scripted web series, and My Mama Wears Timbs, a short documentary about a masculine of center pregnant woman.

Accolades 
Fitz received a nomination for Best Social Media in the LGBTQ+ YouTube Channel category at the 9th annual Shorty Awards. He was named on Pride.com's 2019 Pride 25 list.

Personal life 
Fitz identifies as queer and transgender nonbinary. He has stated that he uses he/him and they/them pronouns.

Notes

References

External links 
Ari Fitz on YouTube

1989 births
The Real World (TV series) cast members
Living people
African-American models
LGBT YouTubers
LGBT film directors
LGBT African Americans
Non-binary models
University of California, Berkeley alumni
Queer people
20th-century LGBT people
21st-century LGBT people
21st-century African-American people
20th-century African-American people